Alkol is an unincorporated community in eastern Lincoln County, West Virginia, United States.  It lies along West Virginia Route 3, southeast of the town of Hamlin, the county seat of Lincoln County.  Its elevation is 748 feet (228 m).  Although it is unincorporated, it has a post office (established in 1916) 
with the ZIP code 25501.

References

External links

Unincorporated communities in Lincoln County, West Virginia
Unincorporated communities in West Virginia